The Rural Municipality of Meota No. 468 is a rural municipality (RM) in the Canadian province of Saskatchewan within Census Division No. 17 and  Division No. 6.

History 
The RM of Meota No. 468 incorporated as a rural municipality on December 13, 1909.

Geography

Communities and localities 
The following urban municipalities are surrounded by the RM.

Villages
 Meota

Resort villages
 Aquadeo
 Cochin
 Metinota

The following unincorporated communities are within the RM.

Organized hamlets
 Bayview Heights
 Day's Beach
 Lakeview
 Lanz Point
 Martinson's Beach
 Maymont Beach
 Prince
 Pelican Point
 Sleepy Hollow
 Summerfield Beach
 Trevessa Beach
 West Chatfield Beach

Localities
 Jackfish

Demographics 

Attractions 
 Cochin Bridge
 Jackfish Lake
 Meota Regional Park
 Battlefords Provincial Park

Government 
The RM of Meota No. 468 is governed by an elected municipal council and an appointed administrator that meets on the first Wednesday of every month. The reeve of the RM is Sherry Jimmy while its administrator is Kirk Morrison. The RM's office is located in Meota.

Transportation 
 Saskatchewan Highway 4
 Saskatchewan Highway 26
 Saskatchewan Highway 769
 Canadian Pacific Railway (abandoned)

See also 
List of rural municipalities in Saskatchewan

References 

M

Division No. 17, Saskatchewan